Pyrrhocoris is a genus of true bugs in the family Pyrrhocoridae, the cotton stainers.

There are about six species. The best known by far is Pyrrhocoris apterus, commonly called the firebug, red firebug, linden bug, sap sucking bug, and red soldier bug. Many aspects of the biology of this species have been studied extensively.

Species in the genus include:
Pyrrhocoris apterus
Pyrrhocoris fuscopunctatus
Pyrrhocoris marginatus
Pyrrhocoris sibiricus
Pyrrhocoris sinuaticollis

References

Pyrrhocoridae
Pentatomomorpha genera
Taxa named by Carl Fredrik Fallén